Yuan Ching Secondary School (abbreviation: YCSS) is a secondary school located in Jurong West, Singapore. It was established in January 1978 as a government-run, co-educational, integrated school with students choosing either Chinese or English as the medium of instruction.  Mr Chou We Chuan was the founding principal.  From 1978 - 1985, the school also functioned as a pre-university centre offering arts and commerce courses.  The last batch of Chinese medium students graduated in 1987.

The school is given support by the School Advising Committee, the Parent Support Group and Yuan Ching Alumni as well as by the partnership with Taman Jurong Community Club, South West Community Development Council, Jurong West Neighbourhood Police Centre and Lakeside MRT station.

Facilities/Amenities
 Classrooms with resource corners
 Air-conditioned problem-based learning studio
 Math/Science, English and Mother Tongue Language Resource Rooms
 Innovation Labs
 Robotics Labs
 Wireless network
 Audio-visual Theatrette
 Dance and Music Room
 Band Room
 Outdoor performing arena
 Eco-science learning and healing garden
 Mini-vertical garden
 Student Hub
 Health and Fitness Gym
 Indoor Sports Hall
 Design and Technology Workshops
 Design Studio

Co-curricular activities (CCAs)

Sports and Games
 Netball, Basketball (Boys), Dragonboat, Football (Boys)

Uniformed Groups
 National Police Cadets Corps (NPCC), National Civil Defence Cadet Corps (NCDCC), Scouts

Performing Arts
 Malay Dance, Chinese Dance, Indian Dance, Concert Band, English Drama, Guzheng Ensemble

Clubs and Societies
 Robotics, Environmental Science, Media Resource Library, Art and Crafts, Lion/Dragon Dance, Infocomm Technology

Notable alumni
 Zoe Tay, Mediacorp Actress

References

Secondary schools in Singapore
Educational institutions established in 1978